Ryba is a Western Slavic surname. In Polish, Czech and Slovak it means fish. Notable people with the surname include:

Jakub Jan Ryba (1765–1815), Czech teacher and composer of classical music
Jiří Ryba (born 1976), Czech decathlete
John Joseph Ryba (1929–2021), American politician
Mike Ryba (1903–1971), American baseball player; Major League Baseball pitcher
Christina L. Ryba (born 1976), Justice of the Supreme Court of the State of New York (from 2016); first and only judge of color in the state supreme court's third department

See also
 
2523 Ryba, a main-belt asteroid

Czech-language surnames
Polish-language surnames